Penstemon strictus, the Rocky Mountain penstemon, is a penstemon (common name beardtongue) with showy blue flowers.

Description
This species is a herbaceous perennial with a few stems rising nearly straight up from a thick crown.  The leaves are long and narrow, with stem leaves smaller and especially narrower than the basal leaves.  The leaves are entire and smooth, or possibly downy near the petiole.  The inflorescence is a spike (technically a thyrse of 4 to 10 verticillasters).  The corolla is 24 to 32 mm (1 to 1.5 inches) long, deep blue with a violet tube, and smooth.  The two upper petals point straight along the tube, like a porch roof (hence the seldom-used name "porch penstemon"). The seed capsules are 8 to 13 mm long.

Subspecies
A downy (puberulent) form has been called P. strictus subsp. angustus Pennell.

Distribution and habitat
This flower is native to the region from southern Wyoming and western Colorado south to northeastern Arizona and northern New Mexico with an isolated population in Mono County, California  It is found in piñon-juniper woods, with scrub oak, or in open areas in ponderosa pine and spruce-aspen forest, often associated with sagebrush.

Horticulture
Because of its combination of showy flowers, tolerance for drought, and hardiness, Rocky Mountain penstemon is often grown as an ornamental plant in dry regions.  The coldest region where it is hardy is given as USDA zone 3 or 4.

References

strictus
Flora of the Western United States
Flora of Arizona
Flora of California
Flora of Colorado
Flora of Utah
Flora of Wyoming
Flora without expected TNC conservation status